Ian Bayona Araneta (born March 2, 1982) is a Filipino former footballer who plays as a forward who played for Stallion and Philippine Air Force. He is also a former member of the Philippines national team.

While still in his home town of Barotac Nuevo, Iloilo, he was scouted by both the Army and the Air Force teams but eventually chose the Philippine Air Force where he would train and be on duty while also getting the chance to continue playing football.

As a player of the Air Force football club, he is also enlisted in the Philippine Air Force.

International career 
Araneta made his international debut on 11 December 2002 in a friendly match against Singapore prior to the Tiger Cup.

He scored his first international goal six years after making his debut in a 2008 AFF Suzuki Cup qualification match against Laos.  He scored the opening goal but the Philippines failed to win, losing 1–2.

On 12 October 2010, Araneta scored his first international hat trick against Macau in the 2010 Long Teng Cup, which the Philippines eventually won 5–0.  He ended up as the tournament's top scorer with four goals.

International goals 
Scores and results list the Philippines' goal tally first.

Honours

Club
Philippine Air Force FC
UFL Cup: 2009, 2011

National team
Philippine Peace Cup: 2012
AFC Challenge Cup: Third 2012

Individual
Long Teng Cup Golden Boot: 1
 2010

References

External links 

1982 births
Living people
Footballers from Iloilo
Philippine Air Force personnel
Filipino footballers
Association football forwards
Philippines international footballers
Philippine Air Force F.C. players
Stallion Laguna F.C. players
Visayan people